Ho-Chunk Gaming – Wisconsin Dells is a Native American casino and hotel located in the Town of Delton, Wisconsin, between Wisconsin Dells and Baraboo. The casino is owned by the Ho-Chunk Nation of Wisconsin.

See also
 List of casinos in Wisconsin 
 List of casino hotels

References

External links
 Official site

Native American casinos
Wisconsin Dells, Wisconsin
Casino hotels
Casinos in Wisconsin
Native American history of Wisconsin
Ho-Chunk Nation of Wisconsin